The 1987 Rous Cup was the third staging of the Rous Cup international football competition, based around the England–Scotland football rivalry. For the first time, a third team was invited to create a three-team tournament.

In order to gain more experience of playing top level opposition, the FA invited Brazil to be the third entrant. They subsequently won the competition after defeating Scotland in the final game to take the trophy.  This was the last game in which the Hampden Park square goalposts were used.

Results
All times listed are British Summer Time (UTC+1)

England vs Brazil

|}

Scotland vs England

|}

Scotland vs Brazil

|valign="top" width="50%"|

|}

Final standings

Goalscorers

1 goal
 Mirandinha
 Raí
 Valdo
 Gary Lineker

References

Rous Cup
Rous
Rous
Rous
International association football competitions hosted by England
International association football competitions hosted by Scotland
May 1987 sports events in the United Kingdom